Weber-OSCAR 18 (also called WeberSAT, Microsat 3 and WO-18) is an American amateur radio satellite.

The satellite was jointly developed, built by the Weber State College Center for Aerospace Technology  and AMSAT, and on January 22, 1990, as a secondary payload, along with the SPOT 2 earth observation satellite with an Ariane 4 from the Guiana Space Centre, Kourou, French Guiana.

The satellite had an AX.25 digipeater with uplink in the 2-meter band and downlink in the 70-centimeter band, as well as a CCD camera for color images and a piezoelectric detector for micrometeorites.

It was in operation until 1998.

External links

References

Satellites orbiting Earth
Amateur radio satellites
Spacecraft launched in 1990